Bentheim-Bentheim was a county in southeastern Lower Saxony, Germany, the borders of which by 1806 were the modern borders of the District of Bentheim. This county was formed from the county of Bentheim in 1277, and from it was formed Bentheim-Steinfurt in 1544. Bentheim-Bentheim reemerged as a county in 1643  and was mediatised to Berg in 1806, before being annexed to France in 1810. It was granted to Hanover by the Congress of Vienna.

Counts of Bentheim-Bentheim (1277–1530)
Gerulfingen
Egbert (1277–1305)
John (1305–1333)
Simon  (1333–1348)
Otto III (1348–1364)
Bernard I (1364–1421)

Götterswyk
Eberwin I (1421–1454)
Bernard II (1454–1473)
Eberwin II (1473–1530)

Counts of Bentheim-Bentheim (1643–1806)
Philip Conrad (1643–1668)
Arnold Maurice (1668–1701)
Herman Frederick (1701–1723)
Louis Francis (1723–1731)
Frederick Charles (1731–1803)
Louis (Count of Bentheim-Steinfurt) (1803–1806)

Counties of the Holy Roman Empire
States and territories established in 1277